This is a list of Brazilian television related events from 1965.

Events
 26 AprilTV Globo begins broadcasting in Rio de Janeiro.

Debuts

Television shows

Births
31 January - Adriano Garib, actor
6 April - Juan Alba, actor, TV host & singer

Deaths

See also
1965 in Brazil